The Bucharest Metro is an underground rapid transit system that serves Bucharest, the capital of Romania. It first opened for service on 16 November 1979. The network is run by Metrorex. One of two parts of the larger Bucharest public transport network, Metrorex has an average of approximately 720,000 passenger trips per weekday (as of 2018), compared to the 1,180,000 daily riders on Bucharest's STB transit system.

History 

 
The first proposals for a metro system in Bucharest were made in the early part of the 20th century, by the Romanian engineers Dimitrie Leonida and Elie Radu.

The earliest plans for a Bucharest Metro were drafted in the late 1930s, alongside the general plans for urban modernization of the city. The outbreak of World War II, followed by periods of political tensions culminating with the installation of communism, put an end to the plans.

By 1970, the public transport system (ITB) was no longer adequate due to the fast pace of urban development, although the system was the fourth-largest in Europe. A commission was set up, and its conclusion pointed to the necessity of an underground transit system that would become the Bucharest Metro. The plan for the first line was approved on 25 November 1974 as part of the next five-year plan and the construction on the new metro system started on 20 September 1975.

The network was not built in the same style as other Eastern European systems. Firstly, the design of the stations on the initial lines was simple, clean-cut modern, without excessive additions such as mosaics, awkward lighting sources or elaborate and ornate decoration. The main function of the stations was speed of transit and practicality. Secondly, the trainsets themselves were all constructed in Romania and did not follow the Eastern European style of construction. Each station usually followed a colour theme (generally white – in Unirii 2, Victoriei 1, Lujerului; but also light blue – in Obor, Universitate, and Gara de Nord; orange – in Tineretului; green – in Grozăvești), and an open plan. No station was made to look exactly like any other. Despite this, many stations are rather dark, due to the policies of energy economy in the late 1980s, with later modernisations doing little to fix this problem. Bucharest being one of the largest cities in the region, the network is larger than those of Prague or Budapest.

The first line, M1, opened on 19 November 1979, running from Semănătoarea (now Petrache Poenaru) to Timpuri Noi. Following this, more lines and several extensions were opened:
 6 April 1986: M2 Tineretului; 1 infill station
 28 November 1988: M2 Piața Romană; 1 infill station
 5 December 1988: M2 Constantin Brâncoveanu; 1 infill station
 26 August 1992: M1 Basarab; 1 infill station
 31 August 1994: M3 Gorjului; 1 infill station (westbound platform only; eastbound platform opened in 1998)
 20 November 2008: M3 branch Nicolae Grigorescu 2 – Linia de Centură (now Anghel Saligny), 4 stations
 1 July 2011: M4 1 Mai – Parc Bazilescu, 2 stations
 31 March 2017: M4 Parc Bazilescu – Străulești, 2 stations
 15 September 2020: M5 Raul Doamnei / Valea Ialomitei – Eroilor 2 , 10 stations
2026: M6 1 Mai - Tokyo , 6 stations

Lines M1 and M3 have been sharing the section between Eroilor and Nicolae Grigorescu.

Large stations which connect with other lines, such as Piața Victoriei, have two terminals, and each terminal goes by a different name (Victoriei 1 and Victoriei 2). On the official network map, they are shown as two stations with a connection in between, even though, in fact – and for trip planners – they are a single station with platforms at different levels. There is one exception: Gara de Nord 1 and Gara de Nord 2 are separate stations (although linked through a subterranean passage, the traveller is required to exit the station proper and pay for a new fare at the other station, thus leaving the system), passengers being required to change trains at Basarab.

Generally, the underground stations feature large interiors. The largest one, Piata Unirii, is cathedral-like, with vast interior spaces, hosting retail outlets and fast-food restaurants and has an intricate network of underground corridors and passageways.

Metrorex 

Metrorex is the Romanian company which runs the Bucharest Metro. It is fully owned by the Romanian Government through the Ministry of Transportation. There were plans to merge the underground and overground transportation systems into one authority subordinated to the City of Bucharest, however these plans did not come to fruition.

Infrastructure and network  

As of 2022, the entire network runs underground, except for a short stretch between Dimitrie Leonida and Berceni stations on the southern end of the M2 line. The network is served by six depots, two being located above ground (IMGB and Industriilor) and four underground (Ciurel, Străulești, Pantelimon and Valea Ialomiței) and smaller additional works at Gara de Nord and Eroilor stations.

There are two connections between the Metro network and the Romanian Railways network, one at Berceni (connecting to the Bucharest Belt Ring), the other at Ciurel (connecting via an underground passage to the Cotroceni-Militari industrial railway). However, the latter connection is currently unused and mothballed. The metro network and the national rail network have almost similar track gauge (using the  vs ) and loading gauge but not the same electrification system (the metro uses  whereas the Romanian Railways use  overhead lines) making it possible for new metro cars to be transported cross country as unpowered railway cars. This distinction is also seen in the pre-2007 separation between the MTR and the former KCR network in Hong Kong (see Track gauge in Hong Kong).

Lines 
There are five metro lines in operation and another one in the planning phase:

M1 Line: between Dristor and Pantelimon – the first line to open in 1979, last extension in 1990; it is circular with a North-Eastern spur. Part of its tracks are shared with M3 (7 stations).
M2 Line: between Pipera and Berceni opened in 1986, last extension in 1987; it runs in a north–south direction, crossing the center.
M3 Line: between Preciziei and Anghel Saligny opened in 1983, last extension in 2008; it runs in an east–west direction, south of the center. Shares part of its tracks with M1 (7 stations).
M4 Line: between Gara de Nord and Străulești opened in 2000, last extension in 2017.
M5 Line: between Râul Doamnei and Eroilor opened in 2020; it runs through the Drumul Taberei neighborhood.

Signalling system 

There are multiple signalling systems used. Line 2, the first one that has been modernized, uses Bombardier's CITYFLO 350 automatic train control system. It ensures the protection (ATP) and operation (ATO) of the new Bombardier Movia trains.

The system uses an IPU (Interlocking processing unit), TI21-M track circuits and EbiScreen workstations. Signals have been kept only in areas where points are present, meaning that the route has been assigned and the driver can use cab signalling.
Trains are usually operated automatically, with the driver only opening and closing the doors and supervising the operation.
Other features include auto turnback and a balise system, called PSM (precision stop marker). This ensures that the train can stop at the platform automatically.

On line 3, the ATC system has been merged with the Indusi system. Signals are present in point areas and platform ends. Along with the three red-yellow-green lights, the white ATP light has been added. Optical routes can be assigned, meaning that a train gets a green light (permission to pass the signal) only after the next signal has been passed by the train ahead, or a yellow light, meaning that the signal can be passed at low speed. Automatic block signals have been removed.

Line 4 uses Siemens's TBS 100 FB ATC system.

Line 5 uses Alstom's Urbalis 400 Communications-based train control system.

Hours of operation 
Trains run from 5 AM to 11 PM every day. The last trains on M1, M2 and M3 wait for the transfer of the passengers between lines to complete, before leaving Piața Unirii station.

Headway 
At rush hour, trains run at 4–6-minute intervals on lines 1 and 3, at 1-3 minute intervals on line 2, and at 7–8-minute on line 4; during the rest of the day, trains run at 8-minute intervals on lines 1 and 3, at 7-9 minute intervals on line 2 and at 10-minute intervals on line 4.

Fares and tickets 

Public transport in Bucharest is heavily subsidized, and the subsidies will increase, as the City Council wants to reduce traffic jams, pollution and parking problems and promote public transport. Like the STB, the metro can get crowded during morning and evening rush hours. The network uses magnetic stripe cards, that are not valid for use on trams, buses or trolleys . Payment by contactless credit cards is available directly at the turnstiles. One tap will take 3 RON, the equivalent of one trip. For multiple validations with the same card, tap the plus button. Starting from 29 July 2021 Metrorex began replacing the magnetic stripe cards with contactless ones for weekly and monthly passes. As of November 2021 they've replaced most of the cards with contactless ones.

Tickets 
Tickets can be brought from any metro station, from both kiosks and vending machines.
Prices :

Metrorex only tickets:
 1-trip card – 3 RON
 2-trip card – 6 RON(€1.22)
 24 hour card – 8 RON (€1.80)
 72 hour card – 20 RON 
 10-trip card – 25 RON
 Weekly pass (full price) – 30 RON
 Monthly pass (full price) – 80 RON
 Six months pass – 400 RON
 Yearly pass – 700 RON
 Student monthly pass (available for students in Romanian Schools, High-Schools and Universities) – 40 RON (€8.1)
 Blood donors monthly pass – 40 RON

Integrated Metro and STB Passes:
 1 trip card valid for 120 minutes –  5 RON 
 2 trip card valid for 120 minutes –  10 RON 
 10 trip card valid for 120 minutes –  45 RON 
 24 hour card –  14 RON
 72 hour card –  35 RON
 7 days card – 35 RON
 Weekly pass – 50 RON
 Monthly pass – 140 RON
 Six month pass – 700 RON
 Yearly pass – 1200 RON

Integrated Metro, STB and train on the section between North Station and Bucharest Airport:
 24 hour card - 20 RON
 72 hour card - 40 RON
 Monthly pass - 210 RON
 Six month pass - 1100 RON
 Yearly pass - 2000 RON

Standard trip cards are sold as anonymous magnetic strip cards, where as the passes are sold as either MIFARE Ultralight or MIFARE Classic 1000 cards. Passengers can also opt to pay for the trip directly at the gates using credit cards or with Apple Pay/Google Pay. This payment system was implemented in 2019 with VISA, BCR and S&T Romania.

Future service

Under construction 
M2 Line southbound extension:
 Tudor Arghezi station from Berceni to the Bucharest South Ring Road;

Planned 
M4 Line extension: between Gara de Nord, through Soseaua Giurgiului and ending at Gara Progresul at Bucharest' southern limit. The tender for the designing and building of this extension will be launched soon this year. It will be split into two phases, Gara de Nord – Filaret and Filaret – Gara Progresul.
The central part of M5, known as M5.2, is currently designed by Metrans Engineering and 3TI Progetti SpA.
M6 Line: between Gara de Nord and Henri Coandă International Airport. The contract for the first part of the line, known as M6.1 between 1 Mai and Tokyo has been signed this year with the Turkish company Alsim Alarko. They are tasked with designing and building the structural support of the stations and tunnels. The second half to the Henri Coandă International Airport is in tendering process, three Turkish Joint-Ventures have submitted their bids.

These projects are financed by the EU, with the exception of M6.2 which is financed by a loan from JICA.

Other proposals 
Metrorex is also planning the following new lines, routes and stations:
 Line M7; it is supposed to run  from Bragadiru to Voluntari.
 Line M8, the south half ring. Its route has not been fully planned yet, but it will run through Piața Sudului and end at Crângași and Dristor stations.
 An extension of the Line M3 is also planned for 2030.
Two more stations are planned and may be constructed on existing lines, both on M1. However, given the complexity of work required, and the limited benefits these stations would have it is unlikely that construction will begin in the near future:
Dorobanți between Stefan cel Mare and Piața Victoriei;
Giulești between Crângași and Basarab.

Rolling stock 
The Bucharest Metro uses three types of trainsets:
 Astra IVA – 84 trainsets (504 cars), built between 1976 and 1992. Only 15 trainsets (90 cars) are still operating. Until now, 69 trainsets (414 cars) have been retired from service. The remaining of 15 trainsets which are still active were refurbished by Metrorex and Alstom Transport România in 2011–2013, used on M3 and M4;
 Bombardier Movia 346 – 44 trainsets (264 cars), built between 2002 and 2008, used on M1, M2, M3 and M5;
 CAF – 24 trainsets (144 cars), built between 2013 and 2016, used on M2.

The subway livery for Bucharest is either white with two yellow or red horizontal stripes below the window for the Astra trains, stainless steel with black and white for the Bombardier trains, or stainless steel with blue and white for the CAF trains.

All trains run on a bottom-contact , or an overhead wire (in maintenance areas where a third rail would not be safe). New trains from Alstom (Metropolis) have been ordered and are due to arrive in 2023.

Incidents 

In its more than 40 years of operations, there have never been any very grave accidents, however, there have been various incidents, either during construction or operation. Accidents are investigated by the Railway Investigation Authority (Agenția de Investigare Feroviară Română (AGIFER)).

1983: Due to works on M2, the Piața Unirii 1 station was flooded by the Dâmbovița.
April–May 1986: Whilst digging for a connection service tunnel for the M1-M2 lines, the foundations and altar of the Slobozia Church were cracked, leading to the subsequent closure of the construction site of the tunnel, which was filled with sand. Thus, trains for the M2 were disconnected from the rest of the network up to 1987 (trains were sent through the Bucharest Freight Railway Bypass), when another link tunnel was created at Piața Victoriei.
1 May 1987: During reconstruction work at Piața Unirii, the Dâmbovița was breached again, this time flooding both stations and forcing train circulation to cease for the next 5 days as a result. The flooding took place during a heavy rainstorm and during work on the Unirii Underpass (which was opened on 6 June 1987, after a record 34 days of work), when an excavator damaged a collecting canal of the Dâmbovița, flooding the underpass construction site, and subsequently, the M1 station. The M2 metro station was flooded due to an improperly sealed tube, designed for electric installations. At its peak, the flooding was 30 centimeters over the platforms, but further damages to the electrical transformers were avoided.
2 May 1987: During recovery from the flooding at Piața Unirii the previous day, the tunnel between Timpuri Noi and Mihai Bravu was found fully submerged by the Dâmbovița, possibly in relation to the previous incident. Signalling and other electrical cables were damaged, which further prolonged the repair efforts for the previous incident.
4 March 1996: The metro workers began a strike, demanding a 48% pay increase to offset inflation and better working conditions. It continued for at least 2 days, and was condemned by the Văcăroiu government as illegal.
17 November 2010: An IVA train derailed between Timpuri Noi and Piața Unirii.
14 January 2015: Due to a broken pipe, a fire started out at Tineretului station, leading to its closure for the rest of the day.
14 June 2016: Piața Victoriei was closed after huge amounts of smoke originated from the third rail.
20 January 2017: A fire, originating from electrical contactors, led to the evacuation of the Universitate station, subsequently leading to the closure of one of the tracks towards Piața Unirii.
16 August 2018: A train in Piața Unirii had to be evacuated, after someone began pepper-spraying the consist stopped in the station.
26 January 2019: A newly purchased CAF unit crashed in the Berceni depot. The train, which was stabled outside, was being shunted into the depot to prevent icing, however, due to software failure, it could not stop on time and crashed past the buffers. It is likely that the train could be scrapped since there is no way to remove it.
26 March 2021: A sudden strike, launched by the union of the metro employees began at 5 AM, effectively blocking the circulation of all trains. The dispute is related to the activity of commercial spaces within metro stations.

Aside from these incidents, there have been other disruptions, especially in the last 3 years, due to suicides at the metro. A recent one on 25 June 2019, led to the disruption of metro traffic at rush hour between Piața Unirii and Eroilor (the suicide took place at Izvor). Aside from that, in 2017, one woman was arrested for pushing a person in front of a train. These incidents led to criticism of METROREX, and suggestions to install platform screen doors or to increase security. Additionally, railfans reported harassment from security guards, being told "not to photograph in the stations", despite there being no official rule prohibiting photography in the metro network.

Facts 
Bucharest Metro was the only one in the world that operated with passengers during testing.

In the 1980s, the speed of building the network (4 kilometers / year) placed the Bucharest Metro on the second place in the world, after Mexico City Metro.

The shortest distance between two adjacent stations is between Gara de Nord 2 (M4) and Basarab 2 (M4) and is 430 meters.

Network map

See also 
 List of Bucharest metro stations
 Bucharest Light rail
 Transport in Bucharest
 List of metro systems
 Rapid transit

Note

References

External links 

 Metrorex – official site
 2015 Activity Report
 Interactive subway map 
 Bucharest Metro Track Map 
 Bucharest Metro Challenge
 Bucharest Subway info
 Bucharest Metro, practical map
 Map of future lines
 Bucharest Metro Map

 
Railway lines opened in 1979
Underground rapid transit in Romania
Transport in Bucharest
1979 establishments in Romania
750 V DC railway electrification